The Cardinal is a 1936 British historical drama film directed by Sinclair Hill and starring Matheson Lang, Eric Portman and June Duprez. The film depicts a power battle in sixteenth-century Rome between the leading church-statesman Giuliano de' Medici and one of his rivals. Other themes in the film are the Italian Wars against France and the construction of the new St. Peter's Basilica to a design by Michelangelo.

The film was based on the 1901 play The Cardinal by Louis N. Parker. It was made at Welwyn Studios as an independent production, but released by a leading distributor Associated British.

Reception
Variety considered the film to be weak apart from the performance of Matheson Lang in the title role. Questions have been raised about the historical accuracy of the film, which appears to borrow people and events from different time periods.

Cast
 Matheson Lang as Cardinal de' Medici
 Eric Portman as Giuliano de' Medici
 Robert Atkins as  General Belmont
 O. B. Clarence as Monterosa
 Douglas Jefferies as Baglioni
 F. B. J. Sharp as Pope Julius II
 Wilfred Fletcher as Michelangelo
 A. Bromley Davenport as Bramante
 Rayner Barton as  Cardinal Orelli
 Edgar K. Bruce as Spini
 David Horne as English Abbot
 June Duprez as Francesca Monterosa
 Henrietta Watson as Donna Claricia
 Dora Barton as  Duenna

References

Bibliography
 Klossner, Michael. The Europe of 1500-1815 on Film and Television: A Worldwide Filmography of Over 2550 Works, 1895 Through 2000. McFarland & Company, 2002.
 Low, Rachael. Filmmaking in 1930s Britain. George Allen & Unwin, 1985.
 Wood, Linda. British Films, 1927-1939. British Film Institute, 1986.

External links

1936 films
British historical drama films
1930s historical drama films
Films directed by Sinclair Hill
Films set in Rome
Films set in the 16th century
Films shot at Welwyn Studios
British black-and-white films
1936 drama films
1930s English-language films
1930s British films